Sholeh-ye Zarik (also Romanized as Sholeh-ye Zārīḵ) is a village in Sardasht Rural District, Zeydun District, Behbahan County, Khuzestan Province, Iran. At the 2006 census, its population was 324, in 68 families.

References 

Populated places in Behbahan County